Jairo Rodrigues Peixoto Filho (born 31 December 1992 in Goiânia) commonly known as Jairo, is a Brazilian footballer who plays as a centre back.

Career
As a youth player Jairo played for Goiás EC and Santos.

In July 2012, it was announced that Jairo had signed a contract with Botev Vratsa in Bulgaria.  He made his league debut against Beroe Stara Zagora on 11 August, playing the full 90 minutes.

In August 2014, Jairo signed with Portuguese side Trofense.

On 22 September 2015, Jairo signed a contract with Neftchi Baku until May 2016.

On 20 August 2019, Jairo signed for Kerala Blasters FC.

Honours
CS Hunedoara
Liga III: 2021–22

Career statistics

References

External links

1992 births
Living people
Brazilian footballers
Brazilian expatriate footballers
Expatriate footballers in Bulgaria
Expatriate footballers in Portugal
Expatriate footballers in Azerbaijan
Brazilian expatriate sportspeople in Bulgaria
Brazilian expatriate sportspeople in Portugal
Brazilian expatriate sportspeople in Azerbaijan
FC Botev Vratsa players
C.D. Trofense players
Montedio Yamagata players
First Professional Football League (Bulgaria) players
Azerbaijan Premier League players
Association football defenders
Neftçi PFK players
Kerala Blasters FC players
Liga III players
CS Corvinul Hunedoara players
Expatriate footballers in Romania
Brazilian expatriate sportspeople in Romania
Sportspeople from Goiânia